Bani Makram is a sub-district located in Hamdan District, Sana'a Governorate, Yemen. Bani Makram had a population of 12473 according to the 2004 census.

References 

Sub-districts in Hamdan District